The 1979–80 DePaul Blue Demons men's basketball team represented DePaul University during the 1979–80 NCAA Division I men's basketball season. They were led by head coach Ray Meyer, in his 38th season, and played their home games at the Alumni Hall in Chicago.

Roster

Schedule

|-
!colspan=12 style=| Regular season

|-
!colspan=12 style=| NCAA Tournament

Source:

References 

DePaul
1980 in sports in Illinois
DePaul Blue Demons men's basketball seasons
1979 in sports in Illinois
DePaul